Lepono Ndhlovu, also known as Abram Mutyagaba, (born 25 February 1986) is a Ugandan cricketer. He played for Uganda in the 2014 Cricket World Cup Qualifier tournament. He played first-class and List A cricket in South Africa, playing in more than 120 matches across both formats from 2005 to 2015.

References

1986 births
Living people
Ugandan cricketers
People from Jinja District
KwaZulu-Natal Inland cricketers
Titans cricketers
Northerns cricketers